EASA is a low-code development platform which enables “citizen developers” to web-enable existing tools created with Excel, MATLAB, Python, R and other software. Custom web apps created with EASA are intended for minimizing or eliminating development time by re-using the original existing tools as the engine of the app.

History
EASA has its headquarters in Oxford, UK, with a wholly owned US subsidiary providing technical support and consulting services out of Pittsburgh, Pennsylvania.

In 2002,  EASA 1.0 was released as an engineering design tool and first customers started to go live with the platform. In the same year, the United States Patent was granted while the UK patent US6430609B1 was granted  in 2003.

In 2004; P&G became the first enterprise customer.

As of 2005, EASA has an Excel interface for direct links between an EASA application and spreadsheets. The Excel specific capability enables a wide range of industries to employ EASA, including financial, insurance, pharmaceutical, logistics and manufacturing.

Product and services
EASA software enables “citizen developers” to create fit-for-purpose web apps.

See also
 AEA Technology
 Platform as a Service

References

External links
 

Software distribution platforms
Computing platforms